The Beardless Warriors is a 1960 World War II novel  by American writer Richard Matheson. It was based on his experiences as a young infantryman in the 87th Division in France and Germany.

Plot synopsis
Set in late 1944 Germany, during the assault on the Siegfried Line, the novel follows 15 days in a US Army Rifle Squad led by the venerable Sergeant Cooley. Everett 'Hack' Hackermeyer, a troubled 18-year-old from a hellish family upbringing, is just one of several teenage soldiers. Over the course of the story, Hackermeyer will come to realize the value of his own life and shed his guarded cynicism.

Adaptation

It was filmed by Universal Pictures in 1966 as The Young Warriors. Most of Matheson's story was jettisoned in order to build the film around stock footage from the Audie Murphy film To Hell and Back.  The film starred Universal contract players Steve Carlson, Jonathan Daly, and Robert Pine, with James Drury as the sergeant.

Notes

External links

Fiction set in 1944
1960 American novels
American novels adapted into films
Novels by Richard Matheson
Novels set during World War II
Little, Brown and Company books